Our Lady of Graces (Italian: Madonna delle Grazie or Nostra Signora delle Grazie) or Saint Mary of Graces (Italian: Santa Maria delle Grazie) is a devotion to the Virgin Mary in the Roman Catholic Church. Several churches with this dedication often owe their foundation to thankfulness for graces received from the Virgin Mary, and are particularly numerous in Italy, India, Australia, United States, Portugal, France and the Italian-speaking region of Switzerland. Also it is related to the Marian apparitions in which was revealed the Miraculous Medal, also known as the Medal of Our Lady of Graces.

Patronage
Our Lady of Graces is the patron saint of the diocese of Faenza. According to a legend, in 1412, the Blessed Virgin Mary appeared to a local woman. Mary was holding broken arrows symbolizing protection against God's wrath and promised an end to the plagues. Faenza Cathedral has a chapel dedicated to Our Lady, while residents often place ceramic titles with the image on their homes.

Other Italian towns that have Our Lady of Graces as their patron saint include:

San Giovanni Rotondo (as co-patroness)
Minturno
Cautano
Decimoputzu
Ricadi
Sanluri
Toritto

Cotignac
Local tradition holds that in August 1519, Mary appeared to a woodcutter and requested a church be built and dedicated to her as "Our Lady of Graces". The Church of Our Lady of Graces in Cotignac was ransacked during the Revolution, but later restored.

Churches

Italy

 Acquaviva Platani
 Alanno, Abruzzo : A renaissance church of Santa Maria delle Grazie, built around 1485 to venerate a miraculous apparition of the Madonna.
 Alife
 Anghiari, Tuscany : Chiesa di Santa Maria delle Grazie o della Propositura, built 1628–1740., 
 Anversa degli Abruzzi
 Arezzo, Tuscany : A late Gothic church built close to the site of a well, which had been associated with Paganism, and had been destroyed at the behest of Saint Bernardino of Siena.
 Arzignano, Veneto : Sanctuary built after the plague of 1485.
 Bevagna
 Brescia, Lombardy : Basilica of Madonna delle Grazie
 Capua
 Casale Monferrato
 Castelfranco di Pietralunga
 Castiglion Fiorentino
 Castiglione d'Orcia
 Cerignola
 Città di Castello
 Colle Faggio di Monteleone di Spoleto
 Cortona
 Fabro
 Faenza
 Farnese, Lazio : Clarissan monastery of Santa Maria delle Grazie.
 Floridia
 Foligno
 Giano dell'Umbria, Umbria : Small medieval country church, restructured in neoclassical style.
 Grado
 Gravedona
 Gravina in Puglia
 Imperia
 Lendinara (also called now called San Giuseppe)
 Livorno
 Magione
 Magliano Sabina
 Maiori
 Mantua
 Massa Lubrense
 Melilli
 Milan, Lombardy : Santa Maria delle Grazie, site of the fresco of the Last Supper by Leonardo da Vinci.
 Modugno
 Montalcino
 Montefalco
 Montegabbione
 Montepescali di Grosseto
 Monteleone d'Orvieto
 Monterotondo
 Montevarchi
 Monticelli di Olevano sul Tusciano
 Montone
 Monza
 Naples (at least three churches)
 Oratory of Santa Maria delle Grazie, Parma
 Paternò
 Perugia
 Santa Maria delle Grazie, Pesaro
 Piancastagnaio
 Piazzetta Mondragone
 Pistoia
 Preggio di Umbertide
 Ravello
 Revello (a chapel)
 Rome (at least three)
 Rovereto
 San Giovanni d'Asso
 San Giovanni Rotondo
 San Marzano di San Giuseppe
 Sansepolcro
 San Severo
 Sant'Anatolia di Narco
 Scandriglia
 Scanno
 Scansano
 Senigallia (S. Maria delle Grazie)
 Terracina
 Toritto
 Trevi
 Varallo
 Venice
 Vicovaro
 Vigevano
 Villa Santa Maria
 Zafferana Etnea

Poland
Jesuit Church, Warsaw
Kielce Cathedral

India 

Delhi
 Basilica of Our Lady of Graces, Sardhana, famous for faith healing

Philippines

 The Oblates of Mary Immaculate established Our Lady of Grace Parish on May 5, 1946, making it the oldest among the five parishes under the Vicariate of the Our Lady of Grace of the Diocese of Caloocan. The creation of the parish 72 years ago on a 3, 964 sq. m donated lot on the former 11th Avenue, now known as St. Eugene de Mazenod Avenue marked the beginning of the evangelization of the Missionary Congregation in the heart of Caloocan.

Our Lady of Grace Parish commenced when the Archbishop of Manila, Most Rev. Michael J. O’ Doherty, granted the request of the OMI Superior in the Philippines, Rev. Fr. Gerard Mongeau, to establish a house in Grace Park. The Philippine Realty Corporation, administrators of the Grace Park Subdivision, donated the use of eight lots in Block 171 for the church. With the help of the U.S. Signal Corps, a temporary chapel was built.

The first Eucharistic Celebration was done on May 16, 1946, by Rev. Fr. Joseph F. Boyd, OMI, attended by thirty–five people. But as early as mid–1949, just three years after the inauguration of the church, the need for a bigger space was seen. In response to this necessity, the people of Grace Park launched a fund–raising campaign. After two years, a new church was ready to be blessed by the Archbishop of Manila, Rev. Msgr. Gabriel Reyes. The church co-patron is St. Eugene de Mazenod and the feast of Our Lady of Grace is observed every first Sunday of May.

Switzerland
Bellinzona, Canton Ticino : A late fifteenth-century church which was attached to a Franciscan convent.

Malta
Żabbar
Victoria

Chapels, oratories and other sanctuaries 
Catania
S. Pellegrino di Gualdo
Ravello, Punta Paradiso
Teramo
Torretta
Pontassieve

Paintings
There are many thousands of paintings by this name throughout Italy. One may be seen at Grosseto Cathedral (by Matteo di Giovanni, 1470), in the church of San Lorenzo at Poggibonsi, and in the cathedral of Perugia. Unlike the Madonna del Soccorso or the Madonna della Misericordia, the Madonna delle Grazie has no particular iconography, although many of these paintings represent just the head or bust of the Virgin.

Statues
There are statues of her by Antonello Gagini at Chiesa dell'Osservanza, Catanzaro and the church of Madrice Vecchia, Castelbuono, and by Vincenzo Gagini at the Church of San Martino, Randazzo. Another statue sculpted from wood by Mariano Gerada could be found in Żabbar a Maltese town dedicated to Our Lady of Graces, Il-Madonna tal-Grazzja, as known by the locals.

Festivals
Festivals to her are again celebrated in many places. In Italy one of the most famous is at Catenanuova. In Stamford, Connecticut she is celebrated by emigrants from Minturno. In the Maltese Islands at Żabbar and Victoria the feast is celebrated on the first Sunday after 8 September every year and is the last feast of the Summer season.

References

Titles of Mary